Preston Strother (born January 28, 1999) is an American teen actor born in Dallas, Texas. He is best known for playing the Fox in Ni Hao, Kai-Lan, Arthur Junior in Batman: The Brave and the Bold, and several television shows and movies. His older brother, Tyler Strother, is also an actor and now attends Bentley University in Boston, Massachusetts.

At the age of four, Preston Strother started acting, signing with a talent agent in Dallas, who booked him in a commercial audition for Lowes. Preston's first coach was Catherine Hart, a Dallas-based acting coach who has taught many young actors.

Strother first appeared in plays for Dallas Children's Theater, and has appeared on many commercials nationally and locally such as for Pizza Hut and the American Heart Association.

He ran varsity cross country and track at his high school, Oaks Christian School in Westlake Village, California. He now attends the University of California, Los Angeles.

Filmography

External links

References

1999 births
American male child actors
Living people
21st-century American male actors
American male television actors